Sisaket province, is one of Thailand's seventy-six  provinces (changwat). It lies in lower northeastern Thailand, a region called Isan. Neighboring provinces are (from west clockwise): Surin, Roi Et, Yasothon, and Ubon Ratchathani. To the south it borders Oddar Meancheay and Preah Vihear of Cambodia.

Geography
The province is in the valley of the Mun River, a tributary of the Mekong. The Dângrêk mountain chain, which forms the border with Cambodia, is in the south of the province. Khao Phra Wihan National Park covers an area of 130 km2 of the Dângrêk mountains in the southeast of the province. Established on 20 March 1998, it is named after a ruined Khmer Empire temple Prasat Preah Vihear (anglicised in Thailand as Prasat Khao Phra Wihan), now in Cambodia, which had been the focus of boundary dispute. The temple faces north and was built to serve the Sisaket region. Earlier maps had shown it as inside Thailand. However, a boundary survey conducted by the French for the Franco-Siamese Treaty of 1907 deviated from the agreed-upon international divide by watershed in order to place the temple on the French (Cambodian) side.

The Thai government ignored the deviation and continued to regard the temple as being in Sisaket province. In the mid-1950s, newly independent Cambodia protested the Thai "occupation" of what the French map showed as theirs. Since the French map was clearly incorrect, in 1962 the Thai government agreed to submit the dispute to the International Court of Justice. The court voted nine to four to confirm the border as shown in 1907 map and awarded the temple to Cambodia. Access to the temple is still principally from the Thai side, as the ruins are difficult to reach from the Cambodian plains at the bottom of a sheer cliff several hundred meters below. The Cambodian government has expressed interest in building a cable car to carry tourists to the site, though this has yet to happen, pending resolution of the ownership of other areas in the Cambodian–Thai border dispute.

National park
There is one national park, along with five other national parks, make up region 9 (Ubon Ratchathani) of Thailand's protected areas. 
 Khao Phra Wihan National Park,

Wildlife sanctuaries
There are two wildlife sanctuaries, along with four other wildlife sanctuaries, make up region 9 (Ubon Ratchathani) of Thailand's protected areas.
 Huai Sala Wildlife Sanctuary, 
 Phanom Dong Rak Wildlife Sanctuary,

History
The many Khmer ruins found in the province show the area must have been important to the Khmer empire at least by the 12th century, although it was apparently sparsely populated. According to local tradition, it was known as Sri Nakorn Lamduan (.) It was later called Khukhan, after a town built in the late-15th century CE during the reign of King Boromaratcha III of Ayutthaya. Ethnic Laos began settling the northern portion of the province, and in 1786 the town Sisaket was formed, subject to Khukhan. In 1904, Sisaket was renamed Khukhan, while the original Khukhan was designated Huai Nua.Monthon Udon Thani was created in 1912, and assumed the administration of the most of region. In 1933 the monthon system was ended, and the province of Khukhan was administered directly from Bangkok. Five years later, the name of the town and province were restored to Sisaket, with the district containing Huai Nua being called Khukhan.
The Rasi Salai Dam built here in 1994 was unofficially decommissioned in July 2000, following devastation of local farming villages.

Demographics
The province is populated by four main ethnic groups: Kui, Lao, Khmer, and Yer. Sisaket is one of the provinces where there is a sizable northern Khmer population. In the 2000 census it was reported that 26.2 percent of the population are capable of speaking Khmer. This is down from the 1990 census when it was reported that 30.2 percent of the population were capable of speaking Khmer. The majority are Lao speaking people.

Symbols
The provincial seal shows Prasat Hin Ban Samo, a Khmer temple about 1,000 years old, in the Prang Ku District.

The provincial tree and flower of the province is the White Cheesewood (Melodorum fruticosum). The six leaves of the flower symbolise the six original districts of the province: Khukhan, Kantharalak, Uthumphon Phisai, Kanthararom, Rasi Salai, and Khun Han.

Economy
Sisaket is largely agricultural. Among other agricultural produce, it is known for its garlic and its shallots, for which it was rewarded with GI registration in 2020.

Administrative divisions

Provincial government

The province is divided into 22 districts (amphoes). The districts are further subdivided into 206 sub-districts (tambons) and 2,411 villages (mubans).

Local government
As of 26 November 2019 there is one Sisaket Provincial Administration Organisation and 37 municipal (thesaban) areas in the province. Sisaket and Kantharalak have town (thesaban mueang) status. There are a further 35 subdistrict municipalities (thesaban tambon). The non-municipal areas are administered by 179 Subdistrict Administrative Organisations, SAO (ongkan borihan suan tambon).

Transportation
Sisaket is on the northeastern railway line from Bangkok to Warin Chamrap. Sisaket's main station is Sisaket Railway Station. Sisaket has frequent bus service to and from Bangkok's Northern Bus Terminal

Health 
Sisaket's main hospital is Sisaket Hospital, a regional hospital operated by the Ministry of Public Health.

Human achievement index 2017

Since 2003, United Nations Development Programme (UNDP) in Thailand has tracked progress on human development at sub-national level using the Human achievement index (HAI), a composite index covering all the eight key areas of human development. National Economic and Social Development Board (NESDB) has taken over this task since 2017.

See also 
 Khit cloth
 Si in place names
 Sisaket F.C.
 Sri Nakhon Lamduan Stadium

References

External links 

 Province page from the Tourist Authority of Thailand

 Website of province (limited English section)
 Si Saket provincial map, coat of arms and postal stamp

 
Isan
Provinces of Thailand